Ivana Sazdovski (born 12 April 1990) is a Macedonian handball player for ŽRK Vardar and the Macedonian national team.

References

1990 births
Living people
Macedonian female handball players